Banjarnegara is a town in Central Java, Indonesia and the seat of Banjarnegara Regency. It is 55 km from the Dieng Plateau region and a centre for ceramic arts.

Climate
Banjarnegara has a tropical rainforest climate (Af) with moderate rainfall from June to September and heavy to very heavy rainfall from October to May. It is one of the wettest towns in Indonesia.

References

External links
  Kabupaten Banjarnegara 

Banjarnegara Regency
Districts of Central Java
Regency seats of Central Java